Jhonatan Mariano Bernardo (born 7 November 1988 in São Paulo) is a Brazilian football striker who plays for Nakhon Pathom United in the Thai League 2.

References

External links
1. FC Tatran Prešov profile 

1988 births
Living people
Brazilian footballers
Brazilian expatriate footballers
1. FC Tatran Prešov players
Slovak Super Liga players
2. Liga (Slovakia) players
MFK Zemplín Michalovce players
FC Senec players
1. FK Příbram players
Czech First League players
Expatriate footballers in Slovakia
Expatriate footballers in the Czech Republic
Brazilian expatriate sportspeople in Slovakia
Brazilian expatriate sportspeople in the Czech Republic
Brazilian expatriate sportspeople in Vietnam
Brazilian expatriate sportspeople in Iraq
Brazilian expatriate sportspeople in Thailand
Footballers from São Paulo
Expatriate footballers in Vietnam
Than Quang Ninh FC players
Expatriate footballers in Iraq
Expatriate footballers in Thailand
Al-Shorta SC players
Jhonatan Bernardo
Jhonatan Bernardo
Association football forwards